My Unfair Lady (Chinese : 不懂撒嬌的女人) is TVB's first 4K resolution television series. It stars Frankie Lam, Jessica Hsuan, Vincent Wong and Natalie Tong as the main leads, with Lai Lok-Yi, Samantha Ko, Max Cheung and Zoie Tam as the major supporting cast. It aired concurrently on TVB Jade, Hub Drama First, Astro On Demand, Astro GO and MyTV SUPER.

This drama marks the return of Frankie Lam and Jessica Hsuan to TVB.

Synopsis
Successful property manager Molly Ling has a golden touch. The shopping malls under her management have won countless awards. She is also a super control freak. As her number one assistant, her cousin Cherry Ling is totally under her control and works hard for Molly. She learns to flirt superficially, helping Molly smooth over many problems. Just as Molly is looking forward to moving up the company to be appointed to the board of directors, the company brings in Gordon Man, a marketing visionary, to be her equal. Thus begins the power struggle fueled by hatred and ego between the ex-couple. Meanwhile, Cherry discovers that her boyfriend Hanson Ho has cheated on her. In her time of disappointment, she encounters a deeply compassionate gentleman, Saving Ching. But just when she believes their relationship will blossom into love, Cherry finds out that Saving is abnormally afraid of marriage. Can the two cousins, both competent women, but unable to flirt, ultimately reverse their misfortune and find happiness?

Cast

Main Cast
Frankie Lam as Gordon Man Nim-sum 文念深
Hoi Yeung as young Gordon
Jessica Hsuan as Molly Ling Man 凌敏 (Mall姐)
Kaman Kong as young Molly
Vincent Wong as Saving Ching Yat-fai 程日暉
Natalie Tong as Cherry Ling Yu-kan 凌禹勤 (勤力妹)
Sophia Lam as young Cherry

Supporting Cast
Lai Lok-Yi as Hanson Ho Chi-chiu 何志超 (賤Han)
Samantha Ko as Tin Mut 田蜜
Max Cheung as Oscar Yeung Kam-tat 楊金達
Zoie Tam as Annie Chan Hoi-Ching 陳凱澄

Awards and nominations

International broadcast

References

External links
 My Unfair Lady Official TVB website 

TVB dramas
Hong Kong television series
2017 Hong Kong television series debuts
2017 Hong Kong television series endings
2010s Hong Kong television series
TVB original programming